Alexander Barclay Sloan (12 December 1870 – 29 June 1938) was an Australian rules footballer who played for the Fitzroy Football Club in the Victorian Football Association (VFA) and the Victorian Football League (VFL).

Sloan was a member of Fitzroy's inaugural premiership team in 1895 and captained the club from 1898 to 1900. He played most of his football at half back and was a premiership-winning captain in 1898 and 1899. This made him not only Fitzroy's first ever VFL premiership captain but also the league's first ever grand final winning captain, with the 1897 flag having been decided on a round robin system.

See also
 The Footballers' Alphabet

References
 'Follower', "The Footballers' Alphabet", The Leader, (Saturday, 23 July 1898), p.17.

External links

1870 births
Australian rules footballers from Victoria (Australia)
Fitzroy Football Club players
Fitzroy Football Club Premiership players
1938 deaths
Two-time VFL/AFL Premiership players